Globigerinelloides is an extinct genus of planktonic foraminifera from the Cretaceous, belonging to the family Globigerinelloididae and the suborder Globigerinina. It was first described in 1948. The type taxon is Globigerinelloides algeriana.

Species
Species in Globigerinelloides include:

 Globigerinelloides algeriana
 Globigerinelloides alvarezi
 Globigerinelloides aptiensis
 Globigerinelloides asper
 Globigerinelloides barri
 Globigerinelloides bentonensis
 Globigerinelloides blowi
 Globigerinelloides bollii
 Globigerinelloides caseyi
 Globigerinelloides clavatus
 Globigerinelloides douglasi
 Globigerinelloides duboisi
 Globigerinelloides ehrenbergi
 Globigerinelloides elongatus
 Globigerinelloides escheri
 Globigerinelloides ferreolensis
 Globigerinelloides gottisi
 Globigerinelloides gyroidinaeformis
 Globigerinelloides impensus
 Globigerinelloides irregularis
 Globigerinelloides lobatus
 Globigerinelloides maridalensis
 Globigerinelloides mendezensis
 Globigerinelloides messinae
 Globigerinelloides minai
 Globigerinelloides multispina
 Globigerinelloides paragottisi
 Globigerinelloides praevolutus
 Globigerinelloides prairiehillensis
 Globigerinelloides primitivus
 Globigerinelloides pulchellus
 Globigerinelloides sigali
 Globigerinelloides subcarinata
 Globigerinelloides tumidus
 Globigerinelloides ultramicrus
 Globigerinelloides volutus
 Globigerinelloides yaucoensis

References 

Foraminifera genera
Globigerinina
Cretaceous life
Aptian genus first appearances
Albian genera
Cenomanian genera
Turonian genera
Coniacian genera
Santonian genera
Campanian genera
Maastrichtian genus extinctions